Castleford Bus Station serves the town of Castleford, West Yorkshire, England. The bus station is owned and managed by West Yorkshire Metro.

The rebuilt station has 8 stands in a drive-in-reverse out format while the original station had 15 stands on four islands at the bus station. The main operator is Arriva Yorkshire

New bus station
The previous bus station had become rather outdated and had not seen the investment that others in West Yorkshire had, its replacement was a pending issue for the town for some time. Building works was due to begin in 2010 on a brand new bus/rail interchange situated at Castleford's rail station, however replacement was delayed. however the project was delayed and Metro and Wakefield Council are seeking funding from the Government for the work.

In 2013, Metro and Wakefield Council drew up plans for a replacement of the previous bus station. It was proposed that the bus station would have an enclosed waiting area, CCTV, a retail outlet and public toilets. Bus operators, disabled people's groups and ward councillors and the public were consulted prior to construction.

In mid-2014, the bus station closed for refurbishment. Works necessitated the installation of temporary bus stops on Albion Street and Enterprise Way. The new bus station was opened in 2015.

The new bus station cost £6 million and has all passenger facilities fully indoors rather than the previous outdoor shelters.  This brings Castleford bus station up to the standards of neighbouring Pontefract and Wakefield bus stations.

Services
Buses run from the bus station around the town of Castleford and as far a field as Leeds, Knottingley, Tadcaster, Barnsley, Pontefract, Morley and Wakefield.

National Express Coaches (service 426) operate from here southbound towards London and northbound towards Sunderland.

References

External links

 Metro's Castleford Bus Station page
 Interchange work due to start - Wakefield Express
 Castleford bus station - Geograph
 Castleford Bus Station- Wakefield First

Bus stations in West Yorkshire
Castleford